The Santa Fe Passenger and Freight Depot is a former Santa Fe Railroad station located at 150 Central Valley Highway in Shafter, in the southern  San Joaquin Valley within Kern County, California.

History
The San Francisco and San Joaquin Valley Railroad was built in the late 1890s and later became the Valley Division of the Santa Fe.

The station was built in 1917 to serve Shafter, which was at the time a small farming community.

The building's design followed the "standard combination freight depot" Number 2-A plan developed by Santa Fe Railroad engineers in 1911. The design originally included a porch supported by columns, a ticket office, a waiting room, a freight room, and a baggage room.

In 1938, the porch was enclosed and became the new waiting room so the inside of the station could be used for office space, which was needed to handle increased freight service.

The Santa Fe Railroad closed the station in 1978.

Museum
The Santa Fe Railroad donated the station to the Shafter Historical Society in 1979 which relocated it in 1980. The station now functions as the historical society's Shafter Depot Museum.

The depot was added to the National Register of Historic Places on January 19, 1982.

See also

California Historical Landmarks in Kern County, California
National Register of Historic Places listings in Kern County, California

References

External links
 City of Shafter: Shafter Depot Museum — numerous images, and collections info. 

Railway stations in Kern County, California
History museums in California
Museums in Kern County, California
Railway stations in the United States opened in 1917
National Register of Historic Places in Kern County, California
Railway stations on the National Register of Historic Places in California
Railway freight houses on the National Register of Historic Places
Railway buildings and structures on the National Register of Historic Places in California
Transportation buildings and structures in Kern County, California
Former Atchison, Topeka and Santa Fe Railway stations in California